Shabab Al-Adil Sport Club, is an Iraqi football team based in Baghdad, that plays in the Iraq Division Two.

Managerial history
 Bassim Jaati
 Haider Abdul-Zahra

See also
 2016–17 Iraq FA Cup

References

External links
 Shabab Al-Adil SC on Goalzz.com
 Iraq Clubs- Foundation Dates

Football clubs in Iraq
2014 establishments in Iraq
Association football clubs established in 2014
Football clubs in Baghdad